Ryan Sweeney (born 15 April 1997) is an Irish professional footballer who plays as a defender for Dundee.

Early life
Sweeney was born in Kingston upon Thames and attended Richard Challoner School in New Malden where he was captain of the school football team. Sweeney's brother Dan was also in the academy at AFC Wimbledon and currently plays for Stevenage.

Playing career

AFC Wimbledon
Sweeney began his career with his local club AFC Wimbledon, joining their youth academy at the age of eight in 2005. He signed his first professional contract with AFC Wimbledon in February 2015. Sweeney made his Football league début for AFC Wimbledon on 6 April 2015, coming on as an 80th-minute substitute during the 4–0 away loss against Dagenham and Redbridge. He started Wimbledon's next match on 11 April 2015, a 0–0 draw against Oxford United at Kingsmeadow, and was named man of the match.

Sweeney began the 2015–16 season with the club's under-21 side before injury to Karleigh Osborne saw Neal Ardley give Sweeney his chance in defence against Luton Town on 13 February 2016. Wimbledon won the match 4–1 and Sweeney earned praise for his performance. He kept his place in the side until he was sent-off for conceding a penalty in a 2–1 defeat at Morecambe on 12 March 2016. Sweeney signed a new contract with Wimbledon in March 2016 after attracting interest from Premier League clubs Tottenham Hotspur and West Ham United. On 4 August 2016 Wimbledon announced that they had agreed a fee with Stoke City for the transfer of Sweeney.

Stoke City
On 5 August 2016, Sweeney completed his move to Stoke City for an undisclosed fee, understood to be in the region of £250,000.

Bristol Rovers loan
On 20 January 2017 Sweeney joined Bristol Rovers on loan for the remainder of the 2016–17 season. He impressed on his debut for the club, keeping a clean sheet in a 1–0 victory over local rivals Swindon Town during which he had a header cleared off the line. He played 16 times for the Gas helping he club finish in 10th position.

Sweeney rejoined The Pirates on loan for the 2017–18 season. He scored his first goal for the Gas in a 3–1 win against Blackpool. Sweeney made 27 appearances in 2017–18 scoring four goals as Rovers finished in 13th position.

Mansfield Town
Sweeney joined Mansfield Town on loan for the 2018–19 season. After a successful six-month loan, Sweeney signed for the Stags on a permanent basis in January 2019.

Dundee 
In June 2021, Sweeney signed with Scottish Premiership side Dundee on a two-year deal. He would make his debut from the bench in a 2–2 league draw against St Mirren. Sweeney scored his first goal for Dundee in a league game away to St Johnstone in October 2021. Although the club would be relegated that season, Sweeney impressed enough to be awarded Dundee's Players' Player of the Year and the Andrew De Vries Player of the Year awards.

International career
On 18 May 2015 Sweeney was called up to the Ireland U-18s squad for the first time.

Republic of Ireland U21s
On 15 March 2017, Sweeney was called up to the Republic of Ireland national under-21 football team for the first time for the Under 21 European Championship qualifier match against Kosovo. He played the whole game as Ireland ran out as 1–0 winners thanks to a 2nd half goal from Olamide Shodipo.

Career statistics

Honours

Club 
AFC Wimbledon
Football League Two play-offs: 2016

Individual 
Dundee

 Andrew De Vries Memorial Trophy: 2021–22
 Players' Player of the Year: 2021–22

References

External links

Living people
1997 births
Republic of Ireland association footballers
Footballers from Kingston upon Thames
Association football defenders
AFC Wimbledon players
Stoke City F.C. players
Bristol Rovers F.C. players
Mansfield Town F.C. players
Dundee F.C. players
English Football League players
Scottish Professional Football League players